Brasiliorchis gracilis (syn. Maxillaria gracilis) is a species of orchid (family Orchidaceae) native to eastern and southern Brazil.

References 

gracilis
Plants described in 1832
Endemic orchids of Brazil